Amblyseius americanus is a species of mite in the family Phytoseiidae.

References

americanus
Articles created by Qbugbot
Animals described in 1948